Vikramjit Singh (born 9 January 2003) is a Dutch cricketer. He has played for the Netherlands national cricket team since 2019.

Personal life
Singh was born in Cheema Khurd, Punjab, India. He moved to the Netherlands at the age of seven.

International career
Singh made his debut for Netherlands A at the age of 15.

In September 2019, he was named in the Netherlands' Twenty20 International (T20I) squad for the 2019–20 Ireland Tri-Nation Series. He made his T20I debut for the Netherlands, against Scotland, on 19 September 2019. In April 2020, he was one of seventeen Dutch-based cricketers to be named in the team's senior squad.

He made his List A debut on 11 May 2021, for the Netherlands A team against the Ireland Wolves, during their tour of Ireland. Later the same month, he was named in the Dutch One Day International (ODI) squad for their series against Scotland. In February 2022, he was named in the Dutch ODI squad for their series against New Zealand. He made his ODI debut on 29 March 2022, for the Netherlands against New Zealand.

References

External links
 

2003 births
Living people
Dutch cricketers
Netherlands One Day International cricketers
Netherlands Twenty20 International cricketers
People from Jalandhar district
Dutch people of Indian descent